Mu Ko Phayam is a group of islands in Ranong Province, Thailand. They are mostly tourist islands and are pristine and quiet, relaxed, as opposed to Ko Samui or Ko Phangan. The capital of this group is the Megon village of Mea Mei. There are about 30 islands with a size of 45 km2 and population of 1172 divided between the 2 tambons of Ko Phayam and Bang Rin of Mueang Ranong District.

List of islands

Notes

External links
 
 Voy:Ko Phayam
 Koh Phayam Activities and Things to do
Islands of Thailand
Geography of Ranong province